Bernhard Fuchs (born 1971 in Haslach a.d. Mühl / Upper Austria) is an Austrian photographer.

Career 
Bernhard Fuchs grew up in Helfenberg / Upper Austria and he studied from 1993 to 1997 at the Kunstakademie Düsseldorf, from 1994 under Bernd Becher. From 1997 to 1999 he completed a post-graduate study in a masterclass at the Hochschule für Grafik und Buchkunst Leipzig under Timm Rautert.

Fuchs lives and works in Düsseldorf.

Bernhard Fuchs received the Austrian Art Award for Media Art in the field of Artistic Photography in 2017.

Publications 
 Portrait Photographs. Edition Fotohof, Salzburg 2003.
 Autos. Koenig Books, London 2006.
 Roads and Paths. Koenig Books, London 2009. 
 Farms. Koenig Books, London 2011.
 Woodlands. Koenig Books, London 2014
 Fathom. Koenig Books, London 2018
 Mühl. Koenig Books, London 2020

Exhibitions

Solo exhibitions 

 1996: Portraits, Westfälischer Kunstverein Münster
 2000: Portraits in Farbe, Museum Folkwang, Essen
 2004: Portraitfotografien 1994–2001, Museum für Gegenwartskunst Siegen, Siegen
 2006: Portraits und Autos, Landesgalerie Linz, Linz
 2007: Autos und Portraits, Museum Ludwig, Cologne
 2009: Straßen und Wege, Josef Albers Museum Quadrat, Bottrop
 2010: Porträts, Kunsthalle Krems, Krems
 2012: Portraits/Autos/Straßen und Wege, Sprengel Museum, Hannover
 2014: Waldungen, Josef Albers Museum Quadrat, Bottrop
 2015: Waldungen, Lentos Art Museum, Linz
 2020: Mühl, Josef Albers Museum Quadrat, Bottrop

Group exhibitions 
 1996: Manifesta 1, Chabot Museum, Rotterdam
 2000: How you look at it, Sprengel Museum, Hannover
 2002: today till now – zeitgenössische Fotografie aus Düsseldorf, Museum Kunst Palast, Düsseldorf
 2006: Who is the other, Zacheta National Gallery of Art, Warsaw
 2003: Landschaft, Kunsthalle Wilhelmshaven, Wilhelmshaven
 2008: On the human being, Centro Andaluz de Arte Contemporáneo, Sevilla
 2010: Der Rote Bulli, Stephen Shore und die neue Düsseldorfer Fotografie, NRW Forum, Düsseldorf
 2012: Der Mensch und seine Objekte, Museum Folkwang, Essen
 2015: Landscape in my mind, Bank Austria Kunstforum, Vienna
 2020: Subjekt und Objekt.Foto Rhein Ruhr, Kunsthalle Düsseldorf, Düsseldorf
 2022: Faces. Avedon bis Newton, Albertina, Vienna

References

External links 
 

1971 births
Living people
Austrian photographers
Hochschule für Grafik und Buchkunst Leipzig alumni
People from Rohrbach District